Canto del Llano  is a corregimiento in Santiago District, Veraguas Province, Panama with a population of 25,627 as of 2014. It was created by Law 1 of January 7, 1993. Its population as of 2000 was 23,654.

References

Corregimientos of Veraguas Province